Dichrocephala is a genus of flowering plants in the family Asteraceae, native to tropical Africa and southern Asia.

 Species
 Dichrocephala benthamii C.B.Clarke - China, Indian Subcontinent, Indochina
 Dichrocephala chrysanthemifolia (Blume) DC. - tropical Africa, Arabian Peninsula, Indian Subcontinent, Tibet, southwestern China, Indochina, Japan, Java, Philippines
 Dichrocephala gossypina Baker - Madagascar
 Dichrocephala integrifolia (L.f.) Kuntze - tropical and southern Africa, Madagascar, Yemen, Turkey, Caucasus, Iran, China, Southeast Asia, New Guinea, Australia, some Pacific Islands including Hawaii

References

Astereae
Asteraceae genera